Edward Nelson Jr. (March 17, 1931 – June 5, 2018) was a United States Coast Guard rear admiral. He was Superintendent at the United States Coast Guard Academy from June 1982 to June 1986. He retired in 1989 after serving as Commander
of the Seventeenth Coast Guard District. He died in 2018.

References

1931 births
United States Coast Guard admirals
2018 deaths